The Lakshmi Vilas Palace in Vadodara, Gujarat, India, was constructed by the Gaekwad family, a prominent Maratha family, who ruled the Baroda State. Major Charles Mant was credited to be the main architect of the palace.

Lakshmi Vilas Palace was styled on the Indo-Saracenic Revival architecture, built by Maharaja Sayajirao Gaekwad III in 1890 at a cost of £180,000 (₹27,00,000).

Overview

It is reputed to have been the largest private dwelling built until that time, and four times the size of Buckingham Palace. At the time of construction, it boasted the most modern amenities such as elevators and the interior is reminiscent of a large European country house. It remains the residence of the royal family, who continue to be held in high esteem by the residents of Baroda.

The Palace compound is of over 500 acres and houses a number of buildings, particularly the LVP Banquets & Conventions, Moti Bagh Palace and the Maharaja Fateh Singh Museum building.

In the 1930s Maharaja Pratapsinh created a golf course for use by his European guests. In the 1990s, Pratapsinh's grandson Samarjitsinh, a former Ranji trophy cricket player, renovated the course and opened it to the public.

In popular culture

Movies
Prem Rog in 1982
Dil Hi Toh Hai in 1993
Grand Masti in 2013
Sardaar Gabbar Singh in 2016

See also
New Palace, Kolhapur of the Bhonsle Chhatrapatis
Jai Vilas Mahal, Gwalior of the Scindias
Rajwada, Indore of the Holkars
Shaniwar Wada, Pune of the Peshwas
Thanjavur Maratha palace of the Bhonsles
Narmada Kothi (Maharajah of Indore Retreat Palace), Barwaha

References

Grand Masti makers shoot at historical Laxmi Vilas Palace; Hindustan Times
Marcopolo 2017 by Flamingo Transworld at Laxmi Vilas Palace, Vadodara; Event on 30 July 2017 by Flamingo Transworld

External links

Buildings and structures of the Maratha Empire
Royal residences in India
Tourist attractions in Vadodara
Palaces in Gujarat
Baroda State
Buildings and structures in Vadodara
Houses completed in 1890
Defunct cricket grounds in India